Raja is an Indian term for a monarch, or princely ruler.

Raja may also refer to:

Elephants 
 Raja (elephant) (died 1988), a Sri Lankan tusker elephant belonging to Sri Dalada Maligawa
 Heiyantuduwa Raja (1924–2002), a privately owned Sri Lankan tusker elephant whose skeleton is now in display at the National Museum, Sri Lanka

Popular culture 
 Raja (1943 film), an Indian Hindi-language film
 Raja (1972 film), an Indian Tamil-language film
 Raaja, an Indian Hindi-language film
 Raja (1995 film), an Indian Hindi-language film
 Raja (1999 Indian film), an Indian Telugu-language film
 Raja (2002 film), an Indian Tamil-language film
 Raja (2003 film), a French/Moroccan film
 Raja (2019 film), an Indian Bhojpuri-language film
 Raja (album), a 2008 album by Stam1na
 Raja (play), a 1910 play by Rabindranath Tagore

Places 
 Raja, Jõgeva County, village in Kasepää Parish, Jõgeva County, Estonia
 Raja, Viljandi County, village in Halliste Parish, Viljandi County, Estonia
 Raga, South Sudan, also known as Raja, town and capital of Lol State
 Raga County, also known as Raja, in Western Bahr el Ghazal, South Sudan

People
 Raja (name), a list of people with the given name and surname
 Raja (Tamil actor) (born 1965), an Indian film actor
 Raja (Telugu actor) (born 1978), an Indian film actor
 Raja Gemini (born 1974), American drag queen

Sports 
 El Raja SC, an Egyptian sports club
 Raja Casablanca, a Moroccan sports club

Other uses 
 Rāja yoga, one of the four major yogic paths of Hinduism
 Raja (fish), a genus of rays
 Raja (festival), an annual event in Odisha, India
 Rajas con crema, a Mexican ingredient of chiles and onions, used in many dishes
 The raja, a piece in the board game chaturanga

See also 
 Radja
 Rai (surname)
 Raj (disambiguation)
 Rajah (disambiguation)
 Rajan
 Rajas
 Rajiv
 Rajput
 Raju (disambiguation)
 Rana (disambiguation)
 Maharaj
 Roger